"Heartbreak Anniversary" is a song by American singer-songwriter Giveon. It was released on February 21, 2020, as the second single from his debut EP, Take Time (2020). Written from the perspective of a friend of Giveon's, the downtempo piano ballad finds him singing about the date of a breakup, reminiscing and grieving about a love gone wrong. The song became a sleeper hit, garnering chart success in early 2021, with a music video subsequently being released, and the song was sent to US radio, in March 2021. It reached number one in Malaysia and Singapore.

"Heartbreak Anniversary" was also included on Giveon's compilation album, When It's All Said and Done... Take Time, released in March 2021. The song has been certified 4× platinum by the Recording Industry Association of America (RIAA).

Background and writing
"Heartbreak Anniversary" was written by Giveon from the perspective of someone else, as Giveon explained: "I was talking to a friend, and they told me they broke up with their significant other exactly a year ago, and I was like, 'Oh, alright, I'm going to write a song about that'. In an interview with Billboard, Giveon said that he drew further inspiration from how he copes with a day that continues to bring many "lovesick" memories every year. He stated, 

"Heartbreak  Anniversary" was released on Giveon's birthday. In early 2021, the song went viral on the video-sharing app, TikTok. By March 15, 2021, the song had surpassed 143 million streams, including 97 million streams on Spotify.

Composition and lyrics
On "Heartbreak  Anniversary", Giveon sings about the day his heart was broken, reminiscing about every detail, and the pain that comes with heartbreak. He appears emotional and vulnerable, "foolishly" hoping that his ex lover will return. Musically, Giveon delivers soaring vocals over a largely piano and percussion-based  
mid-tempo electro and soul merged instrumental. Apple Music noted how he creates "harmonies with himself that render a simple line like 'Don't want to let you out my head' as gospel". Rolling Stones Elias Leight labeled the song "a swelling, disconsolate ballad built around mournful piano and gnarled guitars. Giveon's vocals on the song was compared to that of Frank Sinatra, but "with an R&B flavour and a young fresh take on the Rat Pack style".

Critical reception
Milcah P. of HotNewHipHop  called the song "enchanting", further stating: "The cut is characterized by a seamless mixture of Giveon's signature baritone and flawless falsettos. It's a wonderful display of range and composition and easily has Giveon pegged as one to watch within the R&B realm". Writing for Manila Bulletin, Punch Liwanag said the track "is the best representation of who and what Givēon is all about, at least for the time being". Uproxx's Wongo Okon called it a standout from Take Time. Similarly, Billboards Carl Lamarre said "Highlights [on Take Time] like 'Heartbreak Anniversary' and 'Favorite Mistake' showcase his penchant for pensive lyrics and moody soundscapes". Pitchfork named the song among their "Pitchfork Selects" playlist for the week of March 22, 2021. NPR's Sidney Madden included the song in their Heat Check feature for February 2021, noting the wishful lyrics: "being 'foolishly patient' will serve you no good here. This is the type of firmly rooted pain that only twists deeper".

Accolades

Music video
The official video was released on March 12, 2021, over a year after the single's release. It was directed by Salomon Ligthelm, and released on the same day as Giveon's compilation, When It's All Said and Done... Take Time. The "aesthetically pleasing" visual finds Giveon grieving and reflecting on the good and bad times he had with his ex lover, played by Samantha Logan. He is seen transitioning between his "lonely present and his turbulent past".
In a May 2020 interview with Billboard, Giveon said he could see himself making a short film or story out of the song, because it has "so much depth [...] and a lot of stuff that wasn't told in the song. 'Heartbreak Anniversary' just talks about the break-up. It doesn't talk about what led to the break-up".

Commercial performance
The song initially broke out in Southeast Asia, reaching number one on the Spotify charts in the Philippines, Malaysia, Singapore and Indonesia, and the top 10 of various other countries. It has been certified 3× Platinum by the RIAA for units of over 3,000,000 in the US.

Credits and personnel
Credits adapted from Billboard.

 Giveon – vocals, songwriter, composer
 Sevn Thomas – songwriter, composer, production
 Maneesh Bidaye – songwriter, composer, production
 Varren Wade – songwriter, composer

Charts

Weekly charts

Year-end charts

Certifications

Release history

See also 
 List of number-one songs of 2021 (Malaysia)
 List of number-one songs of 2021 (Singapore)

References

External links
"Heartbreak Anniversary" official audio on YouTube
Giveon "Heartbreak Anniversary" Official Lyrics & Meaning | Verified via Genius on YouTube

2020 singles
2020 songs
Epic Records singles
Giveon songs
Songs written by Giveon
Songs written by Sevn Thomas
American contemporary R&B songs
Electro songs
American soul songs
Number-one singles in Malaysia
Number-one singles in Singapore
Songs about heartache